Rowing at the 2014 Summer Youth Olympics was held from 17 to 20 August at the Nanjing Rowing-Canoeing School in Nanjing, China.

Qualification

Four qualification events were held to determine the representation for the 2014 Youth Olympics, the 2013 World Junior Championships and three continental qualifiers. Each National Olympic Committee (NOC) can enter a maximum of 2 boats, 1 per each gender. Should China not qualify any boats they would be given a boat in single sculls for each gender. The host quota was not used as they qualified from the Asian regatta. In addition six athlete quotas, three from each gender will be decided by the Tripartite Commission. Only four spots, two from each gender were decided by the Tripartite Commission. The other two spots were reallocated based on the performances from the 2013 World Junior Championships.

To be eligible to participate at the Youth Olympics athletes must have been born between 1 January 1996 and 31 December 1997. Should a NOC qualify two boats from the same gender the boat with the higher ranking will be qualified and the next highest ranked NOC will qualify.

Summary

Single Sculls

Pairs

Schedule

The schedule was released by the Nanjing Youth Olympic Games Organizing Committee.

All times are CST (UTC+8)

Medal summary

Medal table

Boys

Girls

Final Results

Male - Single Sculls

Female - Single Sculls

Male - Double Sculls

Female - Double Sculls

References

External links
Official Results Book – Rowing

 
2014 Summer Youth Olympics events
Youth Summer Olympics
2014
Rowing competitions in China